Auguste-Hilaire Eugène Lampsonius (1822–71) was a French painter and illustrator.

He is best known for his illustrations of the works of Eugène Sue, Honoré de Balzac, and Alexandre Dumas, as well as for his graphite portraits of Comédie-Française actors. He signed these portraits as Eustache Lorsay.

Lampsonius was born in Joué-du-Bois, and died in Paris in 1871.

See also
Michel Lévy Frères

References

1822 births
1871 deaths
19th-century French painters
French male painters
French illustrators
People from Orne
French portrait painters
Burials at Père Lachaise Cemetery
19th-century French male artists